"Circle of Fire" is a story arc that ran through a two-issue, self-titled comic book miniseries and five one-shot comics starring Green Lantern (Kyle Rayner) that was published by DC Comics in October 2000.

It consists of two bookend issues, titled Green Lantern: Circle of Fire, and five issues in between in each of which a brand new Green Lantern Corps member pairs up with an established DC superhero. These other heroes include Power Girl, Adam Strange, Firestorm, the Atom, and Kyle Rayner. The bookend issues and two of the team-up issues were written by Brian K. Vaughan. Scott Beatty, Jay Faerber, and Judd Winick also contributed towards writing issues, while the team of artists included Keith Aiken, Steve Bird, Norm Breyfogle, Dan Davis, Wayne Faucher, Randy Greene, Ray Kryssing, Mark Lipka, John Lowe, Tyson McAdoo, Trevor McCarthy, Cary Nord, John Nyberg, Andrew Pepoy, Ron Randall, Claude St. Aubin, John Stanisci, Robert Teranishi, and Pete Woods.

Two issues of Impulse, #68-69, follow as the aftermath of the story, written by Todd Dezago with art by Eric Battle.

Synopsis 

The story opens with Adam Strange witnessing the entire planet Rann lapse into madness due to an attack by a colossal cosmic figure calling himself Oblivion. As Strange tries to defend the planet, he is unwillingly transported to Earth, where he gets help from Firestorm and the Atom in alerting the JLA of Oblivion's approach. When Strange debriefs the JLA about the encounter, Kyle Rayner is shocked to hear the description of Oblivion, because it matches the description of a supervillain Rayner had created as a child for a story he made during his period of struggling his fear and anger of growing up without a father. The JLA engages Oblivion, who can create cosmic events such as black holes and dwarf stars. They are quickly overpowered, so Rayner retreats to gather other heroes to help him.

After a brief warning from the Spectre that someone close to Rayner would betray him, the Green Lantern asks for assistance from Oracle, who sends over Power Girl. Just as she arrives to help, however, a group of six new Green Lanterns appears out of nowhere, each of them claiming to be the sole protector of Earth in a different time or universe. They are:
 Pel Tavin, the Emerald Knight, a Daxamite knight from the 13th century.
 Ali Rayner-West, Green Lightning, a descendant of both Rayner and Wally West, who has both a power ring and superspeed.
 Hunter and Forest Rayner, cousins and members of the Teen Lantern Corps, who are from a world where Rayner's descendants all share his original power ring.
 G.L.7177.6, a reprogrammed Manhunter android.
 Alexandra DeWitt who, in an alternate timeline, had received the last power ring only to have Rayner murdered soon thereafter (an inversion of Rayner's story).

Rayner splits the group of heroes up to go investigate Oblivion's arrival and rescue the captured JLA, pairing Power Girl with the Emerald Knight, Firestorm with G.L.7177.6, Green Lightning with Adam Strange, and the Atom with the Teen Lanterns. He chooses DeWitt to be his partner to go and hunt down Oblivion and stop him.

In Green Lantern and the Atom, the Atom and the Teen Lanterns try to figure out who created Oblivion, narrowing down the field to four suspects: the Scarecrow, Doctor Psycho, Professor Ivo, and Doctor Light, all of whom prove to have no idea who Oblivion is. Back at Rayner's apartment, however, they find a sketch of a character, Sir Nobleman, who resembles the Emerald Knight in a notebook from Rayner's childhood, suggesting that Oblivion and Pel Tavin were both created together.

In Green Lantern and Power Girl, the Emerald Knight and Power Girl locate the JLA on a distant planet, only to find them encapsulated in some sort of a yellow crystal. After being unable to break them free, Power Girl realizes that they are not in danger, but rather are being kept safe inside.

In Green Lantern and Adam Strange, Green Lightning and Adam Strange return to Rann only to find it in ruins, not from Oblivion's work, but from the population's madness. They discover the source of the hysteria is a giant green lantern broadcasting a signal that only Rannians can pick up. They conclude a Green Lantern must have constructed the beacon.

In Green Lantern and Firestorm the Nuclear Man, unsure if it even exists, G.L.7177.6 and Firestorm search for the "Omega Option", the only thing capable of stopping Oblivion in Rayner's childhood comics. As they travel through space, they instead come across and battle Professor Martin Stein, a fire elemental who was one half of the original Firestorm.  They eventually discover that the weapon does not exist.

In the last team-up book, Green Lantern and Green Lantern, Rayner and DeWitt deal with their conflicting emotions over each seeing his or her long-dead partner as they track down Oblivion.  During this, Kyle finds himself mysteriously weakening. They finally find Oblivion on the ruins of Oa, so they call everyone to rendezvous.

As the backup arrives team-by-team, the friends fill each other in on what each team had discovered. Piecing together the clues, Rayner concludes that Pel Tavin must be the traitor that the Spectre warned about. Before the Emerald Knight and Power Girl return, however, Oblivion attacks the heroes, killing Forest. As the Atom and Hunter are about to face the same fate, the missing duo swoops in to save them. Realizing that Pel Tavin was not Oblivion after all, Rayner charges towards the supervillain, only to be transported into his own subconscious. There, he learns that Oblivion was created using the power of the ring and the negative emotions Rayner bottled up after DeWitt's death and that the new Green Lanterns are equally imagined, each representing a positive aspect of Rayner's subconscious; Alex is an embodiment of Kyle's capability for love, while Tavin represents his courage, Ali represents hope, G.L.7177.6 represents logic, Hunter and Forest represent imagination, and Kyle himself represents his own willpower.

Kyle also realizes that his current weakening state is because of subconsciously sustaining the Circle of Fire's existences with his willpower, and he eventually would die if they are not returned to him.  The heroes agree and Rayner reabsorbs each of them to gain back enough power to fight Oblivion, even Alex herself after she and Kyle bid their tearful farewells. The villainous cosmic entity threatens to destroy everything Rayner loves, starting with New York City, unless Rayner lets Oblivion take over his mind and therefore the power ring. Rayner threatens suicide to stop Oblivion, but Oblivion reminds Rayner that the JLA would be lost forever. Rayner lets Oblivion into his mind, where the overwhelming positive power of Rayner's personality as represented by the new Green Lanterns and Kyle's childhood home defeats the negativity of Oblivion. This was what Kyle had planned all along as he knew that besides sacrificing himself, the other option was to imprison the villain inside of him. Oblivion vowed that he would return once Kyle again gives in to his fear and anger.

Having rescued the JLA and stopped Oblivion, Rayner tenders his resignation. Superman, Wonder Woman and Batman on the other hand interpret this to be a sign of maturity and responsibility and refuse to accept his resignation. The Spectre, who is hidden, watches this meeting and the man beneath the cloak, Hal Jordan, Kyle's predecessor as Green Lantern, is deeply proud of his successor. Following the meeting, Kyle is eager to look forward into the future.

Aftermath 
The story was followed by two issues of Impulse #68-69, serving as an epilogue. After the battle with Oblivion, Adam Strange misses his Zeta Beam due to Impulse shoving him out of the way (the speedster winds up being teleported to Rann himself) when it appears that Strange is about to be struck by lightning. This situation forces Strange to seek the Justice League's aid, to which Kyle Rayner responds and takes the adventurer back to Rann. Along the way, the two try to rebuild their trust toward each other as well as repairing the damages made by Oblivion and the impetuous young speedster on the planet.

This miniseries paves the way for the Green Lantern: Power of Ion storyline, in both plot and theme. Here, Rayner denies the temptation of omnipotence for altruistic reasons. In Power of Ion, Rayner is again faced with all the energy from Oblivion, becoming godlike in nature, only to give it all up.

The miniseries also deals with evolving the character of Kyle Rayner from the perennial rookie of the DC Universe to a responsible, powerful hero in the eyes of his colleagues.

An element of the story was briefly explored on Tales of the Sinestro Corps Presents: Parallax as Kyle once again gives into the fear and anger after the death of his mother, which this time leads to him being possessed by the fear entity Parallax instead of the return of his darker persona Oblivion. Parallax plays the same role as Oblivion with Kyle as he tortures Kyle with his own fear and doubt to continuously break his will. Kyle's childhood home has appeared once again since Circle of Fire during a battle with Parallax inside Kyle's mind.

Reading order
Green Lantern: Circle of Fire #1 (Oct. 2000) 
Green Lantern and Adam Strange #1 (Oct. 2000) 
Green Lantern and the Atom #1 (Oct. 2000) 
Green Lantern and Firestorm the Nuclear Man #1 (Oct. 2000) 
Green Lantern and Power Girl #1 (Oct. 2000) 
Green Lantern and Green Lantern #1 (Oct. 2000) 
Green Lantern: Circle of Fire #2 (Oct. 2000) 

Epilogue:
Impulse (vol. 1) #68-69 (Jan.-Feb. 2001)

References 

Comics set on fictional planets